Glutathione peroxidase 1, also known as GPx1, is an enzyme that in humans is encoded by the GPX1 gene on chromosome 3. This gene encodes a member of the glutathione peroxidase family. Glutathione peroxidase functions in the detoxification of hydrogen peroxide, and is one of the most important antioxidant enzymes in humans.

Structure 
This gene encodes a member of the glutathione peroxidase family, consisting of eight known glutathione peroxidases (GPx1-8) in humans. Mammalian Gpx1 (this gene), Gpx2, Gpx3, and Gpx4 have been shown to be selenium-containing enzymes, whereas Gpx6 is a selenoprotein in humans with cysteine-containing homologues in rodents. In selenoproteins, the 21st amino acid selenocysteine is inserted in the nascent polypeptide chain during the process of translational recoding of the UGA stop codon. In addition to the UGA-codon, a cis-acting element in the mRNA, called SECIS, binds SBP2 to recruit other proteins, such as eukaryotic elongation factor selenocysteine-tRNA specific, to form the complex responsible for the recoding process.

The protein encoded by this gene forms a homotetramer structure. As with other glutathione peroxidases, GPx1 has a conserved catalytic tetrad composed of Sec or Cys, Gln, Trp, and Asn, where the Sec is surrounded by four arginines (R 57, 103, 184, 185; bovine numbering) and a lysine of an adjacent subunit (K 91'). These 5 residues bind glutathione (GSH) and are only present in GPx1.

Two alternatively spliced transcript variants encoding distinct isoforms have been found for this gene.

Glutathione peroxidase 1 is characterized in a polyalanine sequence polymorphism in the N-terminal region, which includes three alleles with five, six or seven alanine (Ala) repeats in this sequence. The allele with five Ala repeats is significantly associated with breast cancer risk.

Function 
GPX1 is ubiquitously expressed in many tissues, where it protects cells from oxidative stress. Within cells, it localizes to the cytoplasm and mitochondria. As a glutathione peroxidase, GPx1 functions in the detoxification of hydrogen peroxide, specifically by catalyzing the reduction of hydrogen peroxide to water. The glutathione peroxidase also catalyzes the reduction of other organic hydroperoxides, such as lipid peroxides, to the corresponding alcohols. GPx1 typically uses glutathione (GSH) as the reductant, but when glutathione synthetase (GSS) is, as in brain mitochondria, γ-glutamylcysteine can serve as the reductant instead. The protein encoded by this gene protects from CD95-induced apoptosis in cultured breast cancer cells and inhibits 5-lipoxygenase in blood cells, and its overexpression delays endothelial cell death and increases resistance to toxic challenges, especially oxidative stress. This protein is one of only a few proteins known in higher vertebrates to contain selenocysteine, which occurs at the active site of glutathione peroxidase and is coded by the nonsense (stop) codon TGA.

GPX1 forms a highly reactive selenenic acid intermediate, providing insight into the way that the protein environment stabilizes these intermediates and paving the way for new therapeutics. Selenenic acid is protected by the protein environment from reactive groups within the protein. The mechanism of action is based on selenenic acid reacting with the amid or amine bond of another protein, forming a senyladmide bond, suggesting a role for this bond new bond in protecting the reactivity of GPX1.

Animal studies 
GPX1 helps to prevent cardiac dysfunction after ischemia-reperfusion injuries. Mitochondrial ROS production and oxidative mtDNA damage is increased during reoxygenation in the GPX1 knockout mice, in addition to structural abnormalities in cardiac mitochondria and myocytes, suggesting GPX1 may play an important role in protecting cardiac mitochondria from reoxygenation damage in vivo.

In GPX1 (-/-) mice, oxidant formation is increased, endothelial NO synthase is deregulated, and adhesion of leukocytes to cultured endothelial cells is increased. Experimental GPX1 deficiency amplifies certain aspects of aging, namely endothelial dysfunction, vascular remodeling, and invasion of leukocytes in cardiovascular tissue.

Clinical significance 
The GPx1 allele with five Ala repeats is significantly associated with breast cancer risk.

Kocabasoglu, et al., sought to investigate connections between oxidative stress genes, including GPX1, and Panic Disorder, an anxiety disorder characterized by random and unexpected attacks of intense fear. Although the GPX1 Pro198Leu polymorphism, in general, did not significantly correlate with panic disorder risk, the study found a plausible association of the C allele of the GPX1 Pro198Leu polymorphism, found to be more frequent in the female cohort, with PD development.

Ergen and colleagues analyzed gene expression of oxidative stress genes, specifically GPX1, in colorectal tumors in comparison to healthy colorectal tissues. ELISA was utilized to quantify GPX1 protein expression levels in both tissue types, highlighting a 2-fold decrease in tumor tissue (p<0.05).

In esophageal cancer, Chen and colleagues found that vitamin D, a known suppressor of GPX1 expression via the NF-κB signaling pathway, could help to decrease the proliferative, migratory, and invasive capabilities of esophageal cancer cells. Unlike in colorectal cancer, GPX1 expression in esophageal cancer cells is thought to drive aggressive growth and metastasis, but Vitamin D-mediated decrease in GPX1 prevents such growth.

In a study looking at gene polymorphisms of GPX1 and other oxidative stress genes in relation to prevalence of Type 2 diabetes mellitus, Banerjee, et al., found that while no association was found in expression of most GPX1 polymorphisms and risk of Type 2 diabetes mellitus, having the C allele of GPX1 led to a 1.362 times higher risk of the disease, highlighting the importance of finding individuals in the population with this gene variant to help treat them early on.

Recent work by Alan M. Diamond and colleagues has shown that allelic variations of GPX1, like the codon 198 polymorphism that results in leucine or proline and an increase in alanine repeat codons, can result in different localization levels in MCF-7 human breast carcinoma cells. For instance, the allele expressing the leucine-198 polymorphism and 7 alanine repeats generates GPX-1 localization that is disproportionately in the cytoplasm as compared to other allelic variants. To further understand the effects of these variants on GPX-1 function, mutant GPX-1 with mitochondrial localization sequences were generated and the GPX-1 infused cells were analyzed for their response to oxidative stress, energy metabolism and cancer-associated signaling molecules. Ultimately, GPX-1 variants heavily influenced cellular biology, suggesting that different GPX-1 variants affect cancer risk differently.

An analysis of GPX1 expression in oligodendrocytes from patients with major depressive disorder and control patients showed that GPX1 levels were significantly decreased in patients with the disorder, but not in their astrocytes. Shortening of telomeres and decreased expression of telomerase were also evident in these oligodendrocytes, but not in the astrocytes in these patients. This suggests that decreased oxidative stress protection, as observed by decreased GPX1 levels, and decreased telomerase expression may help give rise to telomere shortening in patients with MDD.

Interactions 
GPX1 has been shown to interact with ABL and GSH.

A recently discovered suppressor for GPX1 is S-adenosylhomocysteine, which when accumulated in endothelial cells can cause tRNA(Sec) hypomethylation, reducing the expression of GPX1 and other selenoproteins. The decreased GPX-1 expression can then lead to inflammatory activating of endothelial cells, helping give rise to a proatherogenic endothelial phenotype.

References

Further reading 

 
 
 
 
 
 
 
 
 
 
 
 
 
 
 
 
 
 
 

EC 1.11.1
Selenoproteins